Yvan Lambatan is a singer from Baguio and former scholar of Pinoy Dream Academy.

Early life
He was born on September 8, 1982 in Baguio. He is a High School Graduate. He used to work as a construction worker but Music is still his primary source of living since he wasn't able to finish his studies.

Career
Compositions: BABALIK RIN (included in PDA ORIGINALS Vol. 1, w/c turned into a gold record last Nov. 25). "Babalik Rin" was once used as theme song in an ABS-CBN Teleserye. This original composition was one of the four songs performed by group during the 1st Gala Night. He has two other compositions which were pitted against other scholars' compositions during the past two gala nights.

Though he lost the text votes to Yeng, he started gaining more popularity because of those two beautiful songs. In fact, last Saturday, his composition placed second after Yeng as voted by viewers.

He comes from a family of musicians, his father was a jazz musician and his brothers are members of a band in Baguio where he was the vocalist before he joined Pinoy Dream Academy.

For the 12 Gala/Performance Nights, Yvan was nominated only twice (3rd & 7th Gala Nights) but was a 2-time Star Scholar (2nd & 8th Gala Nights).

On his two nominations, he was the Texter's Choice during his first nomination beating Rosita, Chai & Geoff while he was the Teacher's Choice during his second nomination, when Irish was the Texter's Choice, beating Iya & Michelle.

Yvan's highest score in the Academy was 9.80 when he sang SAY YOU'LL NEVER GO by Neocolours and his lowest was 6.00 when he sang NO TOUCH along with Panky, Chai, Geoff, Davey & Rosita. He has an average score of 8.49, the highest average score among the remaining 8 scholars.

His top three songs are Dahil Ikaw, Baby I Love Your Way and Love of a Lifetime.

Expelled Scholar Joan Ilagan of Italy named Yvan as one of her three bets to win Pinoy Dream Academy. Yvan was married at the age of 20.

Post PDA Scholar

Lambatan was arrested for alleged drug peddling in Baguio.

Filmography

Television
Pinoy Dream Academy (season 1)

References 

1982 births
Living people
People from Baguio
Star Magic
21st-century Filipino male singers
Pinoy Dream Academy participants